Pilocrocis acutangula is a moth in the family Crambidae. It was described by George Hampson in 1899. It is found on Borneo.

References

Pilocrocis
Moths described in 1899
Moths of Borneo